Mwene Mbonwean Sultanate of Ujiji is a subnational Monarchy in Ujiji town, Kigoma Region, western Tanzania. The seat of the local Sultanate is Busaid which was called so from the name of the dynasty of both the Zanzibar Sultanate and Oman which once ruled Ujiji under Arab-Swahili Liwalis, the post Arab name of Busaid for Ujiji proper is still used by the locals as "Busaidi".

Background

In Tanzania  prior and during colonialism the newcomers from Belgian Congo collectively termed Wamanyema were politically included with the remained minority autochthonous Jiji population mainly by indirect rule under the local authority of the Arab-Swahili Liwalis of Ujiji with local representatives to the town council with their old dynasties being disregarded and remained active ritually within their respective clans.

One of the significant tribe of Wamanyema is the Wagoma who migrated en masse from ancient Ugoma which is now the northwestern corner of Lake Tanganyika in modern day Fizi and Kalemie of the Democratic Republic of Congo. The Wagoma migrated earlier than their fellow Manyemas due to their invention of dugout canoes mitumbwi ya mti mmoja or in goma language kabelele and their geographical proximity to Ujiji town, the Wagoma of ancient Ugoma migrated with their clans in sequences including the Bene Mbonwe who settled at Busaid. 
The old allegiance and traditional recognition of the spiritual significance of the ancestral chiefs remained intact even without temporal duties but it was recently in 2017 that the old Bene Mbonwe dynasty was restored at Ujiji by its senior members of the royal clan in Agnatic succession as the Mwene Mbonwean Sultanate of Ujiji and became the first Goma and Manyema traditional authority to have Ujiji as its royal seat.

History 
In Goma history the villages and hamlets were many before the emigration and wars and the traditional states comprised several number of them before the immigration of bembe people with significant numbers of chiefdoms or sultanates sometimes under the suzerainty of Uguhha Kingdom the southernmost goma state under the Bakwamamba Dynasty in modern Kalemie in Tanganyika district of Katanga Region in Democratic Republic of Congo.
The Mbonwe Sultanate was incorporated within the newly colonial created groupement Babungwe Sud in the locality of Basikazumbe which is the maternal clan of current the Sultan.

Political organization
Politically Bahoma arrived in north-western shores of Lake Tanganyika in D.R.C with their centralized political institutions that had based on the recognition of autonomous rulers of their village groups with both temporal and spiritual powers vested on single individuals who had the power of life and death over their subjects, so traditionally there was no paramount chief of the entire Goma.

The traditional title of Bahoma Sultans and other related tribes is Kolo. The current Manyema Kolo of Ujiji is Othman Hamza Malilo II
of the Royal House of Mwene Mbonwe itself being a branch of Basuma clan of Bahoma tribe of Zyoba ethnicity of Wamanyema.

References

Sources

Non-sovereign monarchy
Monarchies of Africa
Kigoma Region